David Joseph Rochefort (born July 22, 1946) is a Canadian former professional ice hockey center who appeared in one National Hockey League game for the Detroit Red Wings during the 1966–67 season, on March 28, 1967 against the Chicago Black Hawks. The rest of his career, which lasted from 1966 to 1972, was spent in different minor leagues.

Career statistics

Regular season and playoffs

See also
 List of players who played only one game in the NHL

External links
 

1946 births
Living people
Baltimore Clippers players
Canadian expatriate ice hockey players in the United States
Canadian ice hockey centres
Denver Spurs (WHL) players
Detroit Red Wings players
Edmonton Oil Kings (WCHL) players
Fort Worth Wings players
Ice hockey people from Alberta
Memphis Wings players
Oklahoma City Blazers (1965–1977) players
Pittsburgh Hornets players
Salt Lake Golden Eagles (WHL) players
Sportspeople from Red Deer, Alberta